The Candace Allen House is a historic house located at 12 Benevolent Street in the College Hill neighborhood of Providence, Rhode Island. Named after Candace Allen  (1785-1872) an older sister of Zachariah Allen, a prominent Providence mill-owner.

The Federal style house was built in 1818–1820 by local architect John Holden Greene and added to the National Register of Historic Places in 1973. It is a brick two-story building with a hip roof topped by a small monitor section. It is five bays wide, with a center entry sheltered by a portico supported by Corinthian columns, and an elliptical window above. The interior follows a typical central-hall plan, and has elaborate interior detail including marble mantels, a U-shape stairway, ceiling cornices, undercut moldings, and walnut doors with silver hardware.

Candace Allen  (1785-1872) was the older sister of Zachariah Allen, a prominent Providence mill-owner and inventor. Her fiancé was killed in the War of 1812, and she did not ever marry. The house was, as of its 1973 National Register listing, still in the hands of the Allen family.

Gallery

See also
 National Register of Historic Places listings in Providence, Rhode Island

References

External links
 
 
 

Houses on the National Register of Historic Places in Rhode Island
Houses completed in 1818
Houses in Providence, Rhode Island
Historic American Buildings Survey in Rhode Island
National Register of Historic Places in Providence, Rhode Island
Historic district contributing properties in Rhode Island
Federal architecture in Rhode Island